Jesse Wade Young (born April 29, 1980) is a Canadian former professional basketball player. He also holds Irish citizenship. He played 2008-09 for Spain ACB league club CB Murcia. He signed for Bancatercas Teramo Basket (Italy LegaA) for 2009/2010 season. After being a free-agent for the first part of the season, in January 2011 he signed again for Bancatercas Teramo Basket till the end of the Italian top division season. On December 14, 2011 Young announced that he was retiring from basketball.

Honours
Clubs Honours
Catalan League Champion - 2005/2006
FIBA EuroCup Champion - 2005/2006

Career statistics
 Correct as of 12 October 2007

National career
Young was a member of the Canada national team that participated in the 1999 and 2003 Pan American Games. He also played at the FIBA Americas Championship 2007 averaging 6.8 points and 3.4 rebound per game.

References

External links
 ACB Profile
 Basketpedya.com Profile

1980 births
Living people
Basketball people from Ontario
Basketball players at the 1999 Pan American Games
Basketball players at the 2003 Pan American Games
Basketball players at the 2007 Pan American Games
Canadian expatriate basketball people in Italy
Canadian expatriate basketball people in Spain
Canadian expatriate basketball people in the United States
Canadian men's basketball players
Canadian people of Irish descent
CB Estudiantes players
CB Inca players
CB Murcia players
Citizens of Ireland through descent
George Mason Patriots men's basketball players
Irish expatriate sportspeople in Spain
Irish expatriate sportspeople in the United States
Irish men's basketball players
Irish people of Canadian descent
Joventut Badalona players
Liga ACB players
Pan American Games competitors for Canada
Sportspeople from Peterborough, Ontario
Teramo Basket players
Centers (basketball)